"Crazy" is a 2003 song by Javier Colon, his debut single and hit from his self-titled album Javier on Capitol Records. The single is credited to Javier rather than the full name of the artist.

Charts
The single peaked at No. 95 on the Billboard Hot 100 in September 2003 and No. 42 on the Hot R&B/Hip-Hop Songs chart in August 2003.

References

2003 songs
Javier Colon songs
2003 debut singles
Songs written by Carl Sturken and Evan Rogers